Fritz Heinrich Jakob Lewy, a German-American neurologist, first identified and described inclusions in the brain cells of patients with Parkinson’s disease and published his findings in the Lewandowsky’s Handbook of Neurology in 1912.   I-cells also called inclusion cells are abnormal fibroblasts having a large number of dark inclusions in the cytoplasm of the cell (mainly in the central area). They are metabolically inactive structures of a cell and are not enclosed by a membrane. The inclusions are of various fats, proteins, carbohydrates, pigments, excretory products, crystals, and other insolubles. They are found in the cytoplasm of a cell in both prokaryotes and eukaryotes. They are seen in Mucolipidosis II, and Mucolipidosis III, also called inclusion-cell or I-cell disease where lysosomal enzyme transport and storage is affected.

References

Cell biology